Baggetta is a surname. Notable people with the surname include:

Mike Baggetta (born 1979), American guitarist and songwriter
Vincent Baggetta (1944–2017), American television actor

See also
Baggett